Asota woodfordi is a moth of the family Erebidae first described by Druce in 1888. It occurs in the Fiji Islands and New Caledonia.

The wingspan is 44–50 mm.

References

Asota (moth)
Moths of Fiji
Moths described in 1888